Baba Iddi (born 6 July 1982) is a Ghanaian football striker.

Career
Iddi began his career with Great Africans in Kumasi before being scouted for Alemannia Aachen in 2000. He was the top scorer in the reserve team and he moved to the first team in 2002 playing in the 2. Fußball-Bundesliga. After one season, he moved to Maccabi Tel Aviv F.C. in 2004. After a year, he was sold to Asante Kotoko and played a year in Kumasi before being sold for €100.000 to Hearts of Oak in January 2005. He played another year with Hearts of Oak and moved in July 2006 to King Faisal Babes, where he was a finalist for the 2007 Ghana Premier League All-Star Team. He tried out for Perak FA in Malaysia and Dalian Shide in China, but did not get a contract. In August 2008, he left Perak and moved to FK Vardar in  Macedonia. In summer 2009 he moved to Belgium and signed with KSC Lokeren.

References

1982 births
Living people
Footballers from Kumasi
Ghanaian footballers
Ghanaian expatriate footballers
Association football forwards
Alemannia Aachen players
Expatriate footballers in Germany
FK Vardar players
Expatriate footballers in North Macedonia
Asante Kotoko S.C. players
King Faisal Babes FC players
Perak F.C. players
Expatriate footballers in Malaysia
Belgian Pro League players
K.S.C. Lokeren Oost-Vlaanderen players
Expatriate footballers in Belgium
Ghanaian expatriate sportspeople in Germany
Ghanaian expatriate sportspeople in Israel
Ghanaian expatriate sportspeople in Malaysia
Ghanaian expatriate sportspeople in North Macedonia
Ghanaian expatriate sportspeople in Belgium